Juthapauwa  is a village development committee in Palpa District in the Lumbini Zone of southern Nepal. At the time of the 1991 Nepal census it had a population of 3753 people living in 657 individual households.

References

Populated places in Palpa District